Harcourt Street railway station is a former railway terminus in Dublin. The station opened in 1859 and served as the terminus of the line from Dublin to Bray in County Wicklow. It closed in 1958 following the closure of the Harcourt Street line. Since 2004, there has been a Luas tram stop outside the front of the old station.

History
The station opened on 7 February 1859, after the initial opening of the railway line itself.

The station facade was designed by George Wilkinson, and contains a central arch and a colonnade of doric columns. The station was constructed on an embankment, with the line 25 feet above street level and a Gilbey's bonded spirits store in the undercroft.

Although the line was double track, the station only had a single 597-foot-long (182 m) platform on the west side of the railway, which terminated in a 48'-diameter (14.6 m) turntable at the Hatch Street end of the station. There were two through sidings on the east side of the station, beyond which lay Harcourt Street goods station and the D&WR's locomotive shed. There was no direct access for arriving trains to the goods station, instead 'Up' Freight trains had to pull into the passenger station, then set back onto the 'Down' line before entering the goods station. This was a contributory factor to the 1900 train crash.
 
The first signal box was installed in 1878, and was replaced with an electro-mechanical installation in 1938 at which point the station was re-signalled with colour light signals.
 
The station is perhaps most famous for a train crash in 1900 - a cattle train from Enniscorthy failed to stop and crashed through the end wall of the station, leaving the locomotive suspended over Hatch Street. Nobody was killed, though the driver, William Hyland, had his right arm amputated. The locomotive was lowered down onto a temporary rail line on Hatch Street, and brought to the goods yard.

Following the accident, the Board of Trade recommended the installation of a facing junction to allow direct access to the goods line, and until that took place all trains were to stop at Ranelagh to ensure that they made a controlled approach to Harcourt Street station. This practice continued up to its closure.

After the formation of The Great Southern Railways in 1925, Harcourt Street gradually declined in importance as services to the South East were increasingly concentrated on Westland Row (now Pearse) station with goods facilities transferred to the North Wall goods station. Thereafter, apart from during the 1933 GNR(I) strike, Harcourt Street became predominantly a passenger station. Services to Wexford were transferred to the Westland Row line in 1941, reducing the Harcourt Street line to commuter services. The station continued operating until 31 December 1958, when Córas Iompair Éireann, during its rationalisation programme of the railway network, closed the line from Harcourt Street.

The Luas light rail network that opened on 30 June 2004 utilised parts of the old route. The station building has been converted into a leisure venue with bars and music venues.

Liquor museum

In 1958, C.I.É. opened a liquor museum in the station basement. The exit was to the station refreshment room which was, unlike most other local licensed premises, permitted to sell alcohol in the holy hour between 2pm and 3pm if customers held tickets for distances over 12 miles, namely Bray and beyond. After closure, the museum was moved to the basement of Heuston Station in 1961.

Luas

In June 2004, the Green Line of the Luas - Dublin's light rail tram system - opened. The Green line mostly followed the route of the old Harcourt Street line from Charlemont to Sandyford (it has since been extended south to Brides Glen).  A stop called Harcourt was opened on the site of the old terminus.  Because the embankment which led to the station had been demolished replaced with new developments, the Luas line diverges from the old alignment at Charlemont and descends a ramp before continuing north on the streets.

Harcourt Luas stop is directly in front of the entrance to the old station building.  It has an island platform - a rarity for Luas stops - which is flanked by tracks running in lanes reserved for trams.  Road traffic must travel on the western side of the street.

Gallery

See also
 Harcourt Street railway line

References

Railway termini in Dublin (city)
Disused railway stations in County Dublin
Railway stations opened in 1859
Railway stations closed in 1958
Luas Green Line stops in Dublin (city)
1859 establishments in Ireland
Railway stations in the Republic of Ireland opened in the 19th century